A Russian Diary: A Journalist's Final Account of Life, Corruption, and Death in Putin's Russia, is a book written by Anna Politkovskaya and published by Random House in May 2007 discussing Russia under Vladimir Putin. Scott Simon wrote the foreword and Arch Tait translated the writing into English. Harvill Secker published the United Kingdom edition. In some versions Jon Snow, the main news anchor for the United Kingdom's Channel 4, wrote the foreword.

History
Published after the author's death, it extracts from her notebook and other writings and gives her account of the period from December 2003 to August 2005, including what she described as "the death of Russian parliamentary democracy", the Beslan school hostage crisis, and the "winter and summer of discontent" from January to August 2005. Because she was murdered "while translation was being completed, final editing had to go ahead without her help", wrote Tait in a note to the book.

According to Viv Groskop of The Guardian, A Russian Diary has a stronger emphasis on politics compared to A Dirty War and Putin's Russia, and therefore is "less moving and immediate". It does not focus on Politkovskaya's personal life.

According to the book, Russia under Vladimir Putin reverted into an authoritarian society centered around the ruler.

Content
The book has three parts. The initial section covers the 2003 Russian legislative election and the 2004 Russian presidential election. The following section discusses the insurgency of the Second Chechen War, the Beslan school siege and its consequences, and other events in the second Putin term. She recalled a meeting with Ramzan Kadyrov, Head of the Chechen Republic. The last section describes 2005 pensioner protests.

Robert Legvold of Foreign Affairs wrote, "The tragedies generated by the Chechen war are what she knew best and wrote, knifelike, about".

Reception

Bridget Kendall wrote that the translation was "admirably readable".

Andrew Meier wrote in The New York Times that Politskaya's "insightful black humor" is a positive while he criticized elements of the translation and editing, citing references to Russia-related terms unexplained in the text and use of specific British English terms.

"Who killed Anna and who lay beyond her killer remains unknown", wrote Snow in his foreword to the book's UK edition. "Her murder robbed too many of us of absolutely vital sources of information and contact", he concluded, "Yet it may, ultimately, be seen to have at least helped prepare the way for the unmasking of the dark forces at the heart of Russia's current being. I must confess that I finished reading A Russian Diary feeling that it should be taken up and dropped from the air in vast quantities throughout the length and breadth of Mother Russia, for all her people to read."

Kirkus Reviews stated that the diary entries in the book "may lack total journalistic objectivity, but Politkovskaya more than justifies her bias with this emotional portrait of the dangerous lives of the Russian people."

Publishers Weekly stated that it was "A rare and intelligent memoir-if an entirely depressing one".

References

Notes
 Some material originated from Anna Politkovskaya

External links
 A Russian Diary at Penguin Random House - South Africa site
 A Russian Diary at Random House Books
 Extracts: 'Beslan is quietly going out of its mind' and 'Fascism is in fashion'

2007 books
Books about post-Soviet Russia
Books about Vladimir Putin
Beslan school siege